The 2015 Prix de l'Arc de Triomphe was a horse race held at Longchamp on Sunday 4 October 2015. It was the 94th running of the Prix de l'Arc de Triomphe.

The winner was Anthony Oppenheimer's Golden Horn, a three-year-old colt trained in England by John Gosden and ridden by Frankie Dettori. Golden Horn's victory was the first in the race for his owner and trainer and was a record-equaling fourth success for Dettori. Golden Horn became the seventh winner of the Epsom Derby to win the Arc, following Sea Bird, Mill Reef, Lammtarra, Sinndar, Sea the Stars and Workforce.

The contenders
The five-year-old mare Treve attempted to become the first horse to win the race three times after her successes in 2013 and 2014. She entered the race unbeaten in three races in 2015, including the Grand Prix de Saint-Cloud and the Prix Vermeille. Her main opposition seemed to come from two three-year-old colts: Golden Horn and New Bay. The British trained Golden Horn's wins had included the Epsom Derby, the Eclipse Stakes and the Irish Champion Stakes. New Bay had appeared to be the best middle-distance colt of his generation in France, winning the Prix du Jockey Club and the Prix Niel. Ireland was represented by Free Eagle (Prince of Wales's Stakes), Found (the top-rated filly of her generation in 2014) and Tapestry (Yorkshire Oaks). Apart from Golden Horn, the only other British challenger was Eagle Top who finished second in the King George VI and Queen Elizabeth Stakes. The other French contenders were Flintshire, Erupt (Grand Prix de Paris), Dolniya (Sheema Classic), Prince Gibraltar (Grosser Preis von Baden), Manatee (Grand Prix de Chantilly), Siljan's Saga (Grand Prix de Deauville), Silverwave (Prix La Force), Spiritjim (disqualified after winning the 2014 Grand Prix de Saint-Cloud), Frine (Prix de Royallieu) and Shahah (Prix d'Aumale) who was expected to act as a pacemaker for Treve. Meleagros was a non-runner. Treve was made the 9/10 favourite ahead of New Bay on 4.8/1 and Golden Horn on 5.2/1. Free Eagle (16.8/1) and Flintshire (18.6/1) were next in the betting ahead of Dolniya (27/1), Found (28/1) and Erupt (29/1).

The race
Sahah fulfilled her expected role as a pacemaker, taking the lead soon after the start. Flintshire and New Bay were close behind, whilst Dettori took Golden Horn to the far outside before tracking right to drop in just behind the leader. Treve was among the backmarkers in the early stages along with Found. As the field entered the straight Golden Horn went to the front, opened up a clear advantage and won by two lengths. Flintshire stayed on to take second just ahead of New Bay and Treve.

Race card 

 Trainers are based in France unless indicated.

Full result

 Abbreviations: ns = nose; shd = short-head; hd = head; snk = short neck; nk = neck

Race details
 Sponsor: Qatar Racing and Equestrian Club
 Purse:5.000.000 €
 Going: Good
 Distance: 2,400 metres
 Number of runners: 17 
 Winner's time: 2m 27.23s

Subsequent breeding careers
Leading progeny of participants in the 2015 Prix de l'Arc de Triomphe.

Stallions
Free Eagle (6th) – Khalifa Sat (2nd Epsom Derby 2020), Justifier (1st Caravaggio Stakes 2019)Golden Horn (1st) – West End Girl (1st Sweet Solera Stakes 2019)New Bay (3rd) – Minor flat winnersPrince Gibraltar (7th) – Minor flat winnersManatee (11th) – Offspring yet to raceSilverwave (10th) – Standing in FranceFlintshire (2nd) – Exported to America – Offspring yet to raceErupt (5th) – Exported to South AfricaEagle Top (15th) – Exported to Czech Republic

Broodmares
Tapestry (16th) – Minor flat winnerFrine (14th) – Minor flat runnerShahah (17th) – Minor flat runnerTreve (4th) – Offspring yet to raceSiljan's Saga (8th) – Offspring yet to raceFound (9th) – Offspring yet to raceDolniya (13th) – Offspring yet to race

References

External links
 Colour Chart – Arc 2015

Prix de l'Arc de Triomphe
 2015
Prix de l'Arc de Triomphe
Prix de l'Arc de Triomphe
Prix de l'Arc de Triomphe